Jeremy Isaiah Richard Toljan (born 8 August 1994) is a German professional footballer who plays as a right-back for Serie A club Sassuolo.

Club career
On 5 October 2013, Toljan made his debut for 1899 Hoffenheim in a Bundesliga game against 1. FSV Mainz 05. He played the full game, which ended in a 2–2 draw.

In the summer of 2017 Toljan signed a five-year deal with Borussia Dortmund.

In January 2019, Toljan signed a six-month loan deal with Celtic.

In July 2019, Sassuolo announced the signing of Toljan on two seasons-long loan deal. On 1 July 2021, Toljan moved to Sassuolo on a permanent transfer.

International career
Toljan has played for German national teams at various age levels. He is also eligible to play for both the United States and Croatia and has rejected approaches from both teams to continue playing for Germany.

He was part of the squad for the 2016 Summer Olympics, where Germany won the silver medal.

Personal life
He was born in Stuttgart to an African American father and a Croatian mother. His father, who was an artist, died before he was born.

Career statistics

Club

Honours
Celtic
 Scottish Premiership: 2018–19
 Scottish Cup: 2018–19

Germany
 Summer Olympic Games Silver Medal: 2016
 UEFA European Under-21 Championship: 2017

Individual
UEFA European Under-21 Championship Team of the Tournament: 2017

References

External links
 
 

1994 births
Living people
Association football fullbacks
German footballers
Footballers from Stuttgart
German people of African-American descent
German people of Croatian descent
TSG 1899 Hoffenheim players
Borussia Dortmund players
Celtic F.C. players
U.S. Sassuolo Calcio players
Bundesliga players
Scottish Professional Football League players
Serie A players
German expatriate footballers
Expatriate footballers in Scotland
Expatriate footballers in Italy
Germany youth international footballers
Germany under-21 international footballers
Footballers at the 2016 Summer Olympics
Olympic footballers of Germany
Medalists at the 2016 Summer Olympics
Olympic silver medalists for Germany
Olympic medalists in football